Luboszyce  is a village in the administrative district of Gmina Gubin, within Krosno Odrzańskie County, Lubusz Voivodeship, in western Poland, close to the German border.

In the village there is a neo-gothic castle from 1846–1850 with an interesting landscape park, while in adjacency – an important archaeological site of Liebesitz culture from 2nd-4th centuries (remains of a village and a cemetery).

References

Luboszyce